Yeo Soo-yeon is a former South Korean short-track speed skater. She is a Team World champion as well as a champion and a two-time silver medalist of the Winter Universiade.

During the 2004–05 World Cup season, she won a 3000 m race and finished second in both 1000 m and 1500 m races at the last World Cup stage in Spišská Nová Ves, Slovakia. She also achieved several victories and podiums in relay during that season.

After retiring from competitive sports Yeo worked as a teenagers' coach in Middleburg, Virginia, US. In September 2013, she was also appointed as Sport Manager for the ISU disciplines within the Sports Operation Department for the 2018 Winter Olympics.

References

External links
 ISU's profile
 Yeo's profile at the shorttrackonline.info

1985 births
Living people
South Korean female short track speed skaters
Medalists at the 2005 Winter Universiade
Universiade medalists in short track speed skating
20th-century South Korean women
21st-century South Korean women
Universiade gold medalists for South Korea
Universiade silver medalists for South Korea